Parkin James Krygger (29 May 1898 – 28 November 1985) was an Australian rules footballer who played with Footscray in the Victorian Football League (VFL).

References

 Holmesby, Russell & Main, Jim (2007). The Encyclopedia of AFL Footballers. 7th ed. Melbourne: Bas Publishing.

External links
 

Western Bulldogs players
Australian rules footballers from Ballarat
1898 births
1985 deaths